McDaniel Nunatak is a ridgelike projection at the north side of the head of Davis Glacier, about  north of Mount George Murray, in the Prince Albert Mountains of Victoria Land, Antarctica. It was mapped by the United States Geological Survey from surveys and U.S. Navy air photos, 1956–62, and was named by the Advisory Committee on Antarctic Names for James R. McDaniel, a satellite geodesist with the McMurdo Station winter party, 1966.

References

Nunataks of Victoria Land
Scott Coast